The Fantasy Sports Association (FSA) is a trade group that was found in 2006 to advance the interests of the fantasy sports industry.  It folded in 2010, leaving the Fantasy Sports Trade Association as the industry's only trade group.

Mission
The association is charged with promoting the fantasy sports industry, providing consulting services to its members, and strategic advice to organizations interested gaining value from fantasy sports. Like other industry trade associations, the FSA focuses on:
 increasing the economic value of the industry
 growing the number of participants, sponsors, products, and services
 conducting industry research
 operating industry conferences 
 lobbying for the industry 

The FSA's mission is similar to the mission of the Fantasy Sports Trade Association, which was founded in 1999.

Members

The association was founded in 2006 by major fantasy sports industry players including:  America Online, CBS Sports, EA Sports, ESPN, Krause (NFFC), Fanball, World Championship of Fantasy Football, Fantasy Sports Ventures, Fox Sports Interactive Media, FS Dashboard, Head2Head, LiveHive Systems, NBA, NBC Sports Digital, NFL, PGA Tour, PLAYERS INC, Pro Trade, Sporting News, STATS, Inc., and Yahoo!.

Current Board of Directors
Chairman:  Clay Walker, Senior Vice President of PLAYERS INC

Additional members of the FSA Board of Directors include:
 Steve Byrd, Executive Vice President, STATS LLC
 Barry Dorf, Producer of EA Sports Fantasy Football, Electronic Arts
 Kenny Gersh, Vice President of Business Development, SportsLine.com, Inc.
 Jeff Gerttula, General Manager of Fantasy Games, The Sporting News
 Josh Goodstadt, Assistant Vice President of Multimedia and Interactive, PLAYERS INC
 Kevin Gralen, President, Head2Head Sports LLC
 Emil Kadlec, President, Fantasy Sports Championships, Inc. (WCOFF)
 David Katz, Head of Sports & Entertainment, Yahoo! Inc
 Mike Kerns, Founder, Pro Trade, Inc.
 Joe Nahra, Staff Counsel, PLAYERS INC
 Craig Peters, Vice President of Business Development, Fox Sports Interactive Media
 Rob Phythian, President, Fanball Acquisitions, LLC
 Ross Schaufelberger, General Manager of AOL Sports, America Online, Inc.

See also 
Fantasy Sports

References

External links
Official FSA Site

Fantasy sports